Joanna Mucha (born 12 April 1976) is a Polish liberal politician, economist, member of the Polish Sejm, academic teacher, doctor of economics and from 17 November 2011 to November 2012 Minister of Sport and Tourism of Poland in the government of Donald Tusk. In 2001 she graduated from University of Warsaw.

References 

Living people
1976 births
Members of the Polish Sejm 2007–2011
Members of the Polish Sejm 2011–2015
Members of the Polish Sejm 2015–2019
Members of the Polish Sejm 2019–2023
Polish economists
Polish women economists
Women government ministers of Poland
Civic Platform politicians
University of Warsaw alumni
Government ministers of Poland
21st-century Polish women politicians